The Wilderness 38 is an American sailboat, that was designed by Gary Mull and first built in 1979.

Production
The boat was built by Wilderness Yachts of Santa Cruz, California, United States, who completed at least one example. The design is now out of production.

The Wilderness 38 design was developed into the Wilderness 40 in 1980, using the same tooling.

Design
The Wilderness 38 is a small recreational keelboat, built predominantly of fiberglass, with wood trim. It has a fractional sloop masthead sloop rig, an internally-mounted spade-type/transom-hung rudder and a fixed fin keel. It displaces  and carries  of lead ballast.

The boat is fitted with a Japanese Yanmar 3GM30 diesel engine.

The design has sleeping accommodation for six people, with a double "V"-berth in the bow cabin, two straight settee berths in the main cabin and two single berths aft. The galley is located on the port side at the companionway ladder. The galley is "L"-shaped and is equipped with a three-burner stove, an ice box and a sink. A navigation station is opposite the galley, on the starboard side. The head is located just aft of the bow cabin.

See also
List of sailing boat types

References

Keelboats
1970s sailboat type designs
Sailing yachts
Sailboat type designs by Gary Mull
Sailboat types built by Wilderness Yachts